The Tenzing Norgay Central Bus Terminus is the one of the largest and most important bus terminal in North Bengal. It is located on Hill Cart Road, Siliguri, District Darjeeling, adjacent to the Siliguri Junction railway station, about 6 kilometers from New Jalpaiguri Railway Station. Both State owned North Bengal State Transport Corporation (NBSTC) buses and private buses ply from here. The Terminus is named after the famous Nepali mountaineer Tenzing Norgay who was a resident of the Darjeeling District.

In August 2017 the state government announced its plan to shift the private buses operations to a proposed new site nearby and upgrade the terminus to international standards.

Distance from towns/cities

See also 
 Sikkim Nationalised Transport Bus Terminus (Siliguri)
 P.C. Mittal Memorial Bus Terminus (Siliguri)
 Siliguri Junction railway station
 Siliguri Corridor
 New Jalpaiguri Railway Station

References

External links 
 Tenzing Norgay bus terminus on Indiaplacesmap 
Tenzing Norgay bus terminus on Google Maps

Bus stations in India
Transport in Darjeeling
Siliguri
Transport in Siliguri